Los Arrayanes National Park is a national park of Argentina with an area of . It covers the Quetrihué Peninsula on the shore of the Nahuel Huapi Lake in the province of Neuquén,  from Villa la Angostura.

The forest can be reached by boat from different points of the Nahuel Huapi lake, or a  path from the beginning of the park at the port of Villa La Angostura. This path, full of ups and downs, is also popularly done by mountain bike.

There are a few pudú and huemul deer, guanacos, monitos de monte, and small foxes. Among the birds, condors, eagles, hawks, and woodpeckers can be found here.

Even though it was already part of the Nahuel Huapi National Park, Los Arrayanes was created in 1971 to protect its forest of rare arrayán trees. To protect the soil and the roots of these fragile trees, a wooden path has been made for the tourist to enjoy the view of the cinnamon-coloured trees.

Climate
The park has a cold, humid climate. On average, the park receives  of rainfall per year, most of which falls during winter. Snowfall occurs between July to September.

Gallery

References

External links

National parks of Argentina
Protected areas of Neuquén Province
Protected areas established in 1971
Biosphere reserves of Argentina